Vanessa Gerbelli Ceroni (born August 6, 1973) is a Brazilian actress.

Selected filmography
Television
 2000	- Brava Gente	- Sucena
 2000	- O Cravo e a Rosa	- Lindinha
 2002	- Desejos de Mulher -	Gonçala
 2003	- Mulheres Apaixonadas - Fernanda
 2003	- Kubanacan	- Amapola
 2004	- Da Cor do Pecado - Tancinha
 2004	- Cabocla - Rosa Adib
 2005	- Prova de Amor - Elza
 2007	- Amor e Intrigas - Alice
 2011	- Vidas em Jogo - Divina
 2014	- Em Família -	Juliana
 2015	- Sete Vidas - Marina
 2018  - Jesus (Nóvela) - Herodias
Cinema
 2003 - Carandiru - Célia
 2006 - Os Desafinados	- Dora
 2007 - Sem Controle - Márcia
 2011 - As Mães de Chico Xavier - Elisa
 2012 - Paixão e Acaso - Inês
 2019 -Socorro, Virei Uma Garota! - Helena

References

External links

1973 births
Living people
People from São Bernardo do Campo
Brazilian television actresses
Brazilian telenovela actresses
Brazilian film actresses